Rachel Isabel Yang Bingjie (Chinese: 杨冰洁，born 28 February 1982) is a Singaporean pole vaulter.

Career 
Yang started pole vaulting in 2006 but suffered a career ending spinal injury in 2009. In 2010, she make an unexpected return, breaking her previous national record of 3.75m with a new mark of 3.81m, making her the first Singaporean to qualify for this event at the Asian Games.

Yang briefly retired in 2012 after marrying her coach, David Yeo. She made a comeback in 2015 after giving birth to her first child in 2013, winning Singapore's first medal in the 28th South East Asian Games with a new national record of 3.90 m.

Yang broke her own and the national record  with a jump of 3.91m at the Thammasat University Sport Complex during the 2017 Thailand Open Track and Field Championships. She won the gold medal despite suffering from an anterior cruciate ligament (ACL) injury in July 2016 and an injured heel just two weeks before the Championships.

Career progression

References

Living people
1982 births
Cedar Girls' Secondary School alumni
Singaporean pole vaulters
Female pole vaulters
Singaporean female athletes
Athletes (track and field) at the 2010 Asian Games
Athletes (track and field) at the 2018 Commonwealth Games
Southeast Asian Games medalists in athletics
Southeast Asian Games silver medalists for Singapore
Southeast Asian Games bronze medalists for Singapore
Competitors at the 2015 Southeast Asian Games
Competitors at the 2017 Southeast Asian Games
Asian Games competitors for Singapore
Commonwealth Games competitors for Singapore